Crazy for Love (French: Le Trou normand) is a 1952 French comedy film directed by Jean Boyer and starring Bourvil, Jane Marken and, in one of her first appearances, Brigitte Bardot. Location shooting took place around Conches-en-Ouche in Normandy. The film's sets were designed by the art director Robert Giordani. The film's French title is a reference to an aperitif of calvados drunk between meals, which also features as the name of the film's disputed tavern.

Synopsis
The naive, simpleton countrymen Hippolyte inherits his uncle's inn in Normandy on the condition that he gain his primary school certificate. However his aunt Augustine, who stands to inherit if he does not, sets out to thwart his attempts to do so.

Cast

 Bourvil as Hippolyte Lemoine 
 Jane Marken as Augustine Lemoine 
 Brigitte Bardot as Javotte Lemoine 
 Jeanne Fusier-Gir as Maria Courtaine 
 Roger Pierre as Jean Marco 
 Pierre Larquey as Testu 
 Nadine Basile as 	Madeleine Pichet
 Noël Roquevert as Dr. Aubert 
 Jacques Deray as Duval
 Georges Baconnet as Pichet
 Albert Duvaleix as 	Le notaire 
 Marcel Charvey as 	L'automobiliste snob
 Florence Michael as 	Louisette 
 Janine Clairville as 	La serveuse de la charcuterie 
 René Worms as 	Le préfet
 Léon Berton as 	Le clerc
 André Dalibert as Firmin, un paysan 
 Marcel Meral as Un paysan 
 Jean-Pierre Lorrain as 	Un paysan

References

Bibliography
 Lanzoni, Rémi Fournier . French Cinema: From Its Beginnings to the Present. A&C Black, 2004.

External links

1952 films
Films directed by Jean Boyer
French comedy films
1952 comedy films
French black-and-white films
1950s French films
Films set in Normandy
Films shot in Normandy
1950s French-language films